An aunt is a woman who is a sibling of a parent or married to a sibling of a parent. Aunts who are related by birth are second-degree relatives. Alternate terms include auntie or aunty. Children in other cultures and families may refer to the cousins of their parents as aunt or uncle due to the age and generation gap. The word comes from  via Old French ante and is a family relationship within an extended or immediate family.
 
The male counterpart of an aunt is an uncle, and the reciprocal relationship is that of a nephew or niece.

Additional terms
 A half-aunt is a half-sister of a parent. 
 An aunt-in-law is the aunt of one's spouse and is the wife of the uncle of somebody. .
 A great-aunt/grandaunt (sometimes written grand-aunt) is the sister of one's grandparent. Despite the popular usage of great-aunt, genealogists consider it more correct to use grandaunt for a grandparent's sister to avoid confusion with earlier generations. Similarly, the female siblings of one's great-grandparents are referred to as great-grandaunts.

Genetics and consanguinity

Aunts by birth (sister of a parent) are related to their nieces and nephews by 25%. As half-aunts are related through half-sisters, they are related by 12.5% to their nieces and nephews. Non-consanguineous aunts (female spouse of a relative) are not genetically related to their nieces and nephews.

Cultural variations 
In some cultures, such as Aboriginal and Torres Strait Islander peoples of Australia, respected senior members of the community, often also referred to as Elders, are addressed as "uncle" (for men) and "aunt" for women, as a mark of seniority and respect, whether related or not, such as Aunty Kathy Mills.

In several cultures, no single inclusive term describing both a person's kinship to their parental female sibling or parental female in-law exists. Instead, there are specific terms describing a person's kinship to their mother's female sibling, and a person's kinship to their father's female sibling, per the following table:

Aunts in popular culture 
Aunts in popular culture have not always been portrayed as positive roles.  Childless aunts are often subjected to othering in popular culture and presented as exotic or as having a second-best role, with motherhood preferred.

Fictional aunts include:
 May Parker, the aunt of Spider-Man.
 Auntie Mame, title character in the novel and film.
 Petunia Dursley, the aunt of the protagonist of Harry Potter by J. K. Rowling.
 Vivian Banks, the aunt of the main character in The Fresh Prince of Bel-Air.
 Aunt Sally, a character in the Worzel Gummidge books and TV series.
 Aunt Em, the aunt of Dorothy Gale in the Oz books and film.
 Aunt Spiker and Aunt Sponge, the villainous aunts of James Trotter in James and the Giant Peach.
 Diane - The tomboyish aunt of Daniel in Chicago Party Aunt.

Aunt Flo is a popular euphemism referring to the menstrual cycle.

An agony aunt is a colloquial term for a female advice columnist.

See also
  – includes many articles with titles "Aunt [name]."
 Auntie (disambiguation) (also includes "Aunty")
 Cousin

References

External links

Family
Terms for women